Heteroconger mercyae, or Mercy's garden eel, is an eel in the family Congridae (conger/garden eels). It was described by Gerald R. Allen and Mark van Nydeck Erdmann in 2009. It is a marine, tropical eel which is known from the western Pacific Ocean, including the Philippines, Indonesia, and possibly New Britain.

Etymology
The species epithet "mercyae" was given in honour of Mercy Paine, whom the authors credited with discovering the colony from which the species is known, and assisting with the collection of specimens for study.

References

mercyae
Taxa named by Gerald R. Allen
Taxa named by Mark van Nydeck Erdmann
Fish described in 2009